Lisa Biagiotti (born August 20, 1979) is a filmmaker and journalist based in Los Angeles. She is the director and on-camera correspondent of On the Streets, a Los Angeles Times 12-part series and 72-minute feature documentary on homelessness in Southern California. She directed and produced deepsouth, an independent documentary about poverty, HIV/AIDS and LGBT issues in the rural American South. Biagiotti is a Fulbright Scholar and a graduate of the Columbia University Graduate School of Journalism. She is of Italian descent from her father and  Hakka Chinese Jamaican descent from her mother.

Career
Biagiotti is an inaugural Fellow in the Sundance New Frontier Artist Residency program in partnership with The Social Computing Group at MIT Media Lab. She speaks publicly about digital journalism, and independently producing and self-distributing films.

For her independent documentary deepsouth, Biagiotti spent two-and-a-half years reporting, driving 13,000 miles and interviewing more than 400 people. She was invited across rural America on a 150-stop grassroots film tour, and was invited to discuss the domestic epidemic at The White House and Clinton Global Initiative. Biagiotti's work has been featured in The New Yorker, The Atlantic, Los Angeles Times, PBS, NPR, Oxford American, and The Lancet. She writes about her 5-year journey of making the film in her Director’s Statement titled Same Virus, Different Disease.

Biagiotti is the producer of The World’s Toilet Crisis, an hour-long documentary that aired on the Vanguard series of Current TV in 2010. She produced short video series for the nightly newscast Worldfocus on WNET on under-reported topics covering homophobia in the Caribbean and the humanitarian crisis in eastern Congo—the latter was awarded a Robert F. Kennedy Journalism Award for International Television.

Awards

References

External links

deepsouth official website
Lisa Biagiotti website

American women screenwriters
Living people
American film producers
American women television directors
American television directors
Writers from Los Angeles
American women television journalists
American writers of Italian descent
American writers of Chinese descent
Jamaican people of Chinese descent
Hakka writers
Columbia University Graduate School of Journalism alumni
1979 births
American documentary filmmakers
Film directors from Los Angeles
Screenwriters from California
American women documentary filmmakers
American women writers of Chinese descent
21st-century American women